The 21 Party was a political party in Burma in the 1920s led by U Ba Pe.

History
The party was formed in 1922 following a split in the General Council of Burmese Associations (GCBA). The GCBA had planned to boycott the local and national elections due that year, but a group of 21 dissidents left the organisation to form a new party.

In the elections the 21 Party won 28 of the 58 non-communal seats, becoming the largest party in the Legislative Council. However, it held less than a third of the total of 103 seats, and Joseph Augustus Maung Gyi from the pro-British Independent Party was appointed head of government.

Prior to the 1925 elections the party was succeeded by the Nationalist Party.

References

Defunct political parties in Myanmar
1922 establishments in Burma
Political parties established in 1922
Political parties disestablished in the 1920s